Henrik Ruud Tovås (born 5 March 1987) is a Norwegian handball player.

He hails from Langhus and played as a goalkeeper for Langhus IL in his youth, later SK Njård, Fet HK, Haslum HK (several periods), Haugaland HK, HC Leipzig, Elbflorenz Dresden and Bækkelagets SK until retiring in 2019. He was capped 8 times for Norway between 2011 and 2013.

After retiring he started a career in Société Générale.

References

1987 births
Living people
People from Ski, Norway
Norwegian male handball players
Expatriate handball players
Norwegian expatriate sportspeople in Germany
Sportspeople from Viken (county)